The Perak State Executive Council is the executive authority of the Government of Perak, Malaysia. The Council comprises the Menteri Besar, appointed by the Sultan on the basis that he is able to command a majority in the Perak State Legislative Assembly, a number of members made up of members of the Assembly, the State Secretary, the State Legal Adviser and the State Financial Officer.

This Council is similar in structure and role to the Cabinet of Malaysia, while being smaller in size. As federal and state responsibilities differ, there are a number of portfolios that differ between the federal and state governments.

Members of the Council are selected by the Menteri Besar, appointed by the Sultan. The Council has no ministry, but instead a number of committees; each committee will take care of certain state affairs, activities and departments. Members of the Council are always the chair of a committee.

Ex-officio members

Lists of full members

Saarani II EXCO (since 2022) 

Members since 21 November 2022 have been :

Saarani I EXCO (2020–2022) 

Members from 10 December 2020 to 21 November 2022 were :

Ahmad Faizal II EXCO (2020) 

Members from 13 March 2020 to 5 December 2020 were :

Ahmad Faizal I EXCO (2018–2020) 

Members from 12 May 2018 to 10 March 2020 were :

Zambry II EXCO (2013-2018)

Zambry I EXCO (2009-2013)

Nizar EXCO (2008-2009) 
 DAP (6)
 PKR (3)
 PAS (2)

See also 
 Sultan of Perak
 List of Menteris Besar of Perak
 Perak State Legislative Assembly

References

Notes

External links 
 Perak State Government

Politics of Perak
Perak